Throughout the 2021 National Women's Soccer League season, allegations of abuse surfaced in multiple teams across the National Women's Soccer League in the United States. As a result, five out of the 10 teams then in the league had head coaches resign or be fired, with league commissioner Lisa Baird also resigning due to the scandal. A later investigation led to four of these coaches receiving lifetime bans from league employment, and several other coaches and executives receiving lesser discipline.

Timeline
In July 2021, OL Reign announced that head coach Farid Benstiti had resigned, with the club stating that it had "great respect for Farid’s talents and all he brought to the organization." Later that year, it was reported that Benstiti had resigned following a number of complaints of abuse, including having disparaged players' nutritional habits and fitness. Later that month, NJ/NY Gotham FC announced that general manager Alyse LaHue had been fired following an investigation into a complaint of breaching league policy. Meg Linehan of The Athletic subsequently published an article reporting that the sacking was due to a breach of the league's anti-harassment policy in specific. LaHue's lawyer released a statement stating that LaHue "denies the allegations made against her."

In August, a number of former Washington Spirit players accused coach Richie Burke of abuse. Kaiya McCullough described Burke as belligerent and aggressive, and also claimed he made multiple racist and otherwise bigoted comments towards her and her teammates. Later in August, Racing Louisville FC announced that coach Christy Holly had been fired for cause, with local television station WDRB reporting that there had been complaints of a toxic culture.

In September, the Washington Spirit fired Burke. Later that month, Nadia Nadim, who had played for Gotham FC when it was known as Sky Blue FC, accused management of forging her signature on a contract extension so they could trade her to the Portland Thorns in early 2016.

In late-September, The Athletic published an investigation into North Carolina Courage head coach Paul Riley, alleging that Riley had sexually coerced and verbally abused players on his teams, specifically during the time period between 2011 and 2015 (consisting of his time in WPS, WPSL, and NWSL). More than a dozen players from every team Riley had coached since 2010 spoke to the publication and two named players went on the record with allegations against him. In the article, Riley denied the allegations. The article also stated that NWSL failed to act on Riley's alleged abuses multiple times, including earlier in 2021 when the league declined to act on an offer from two of Riley's alleged victims to assist in investigating Riley's alleged abuses. Later that day, the Courage announced that Riley had been fired due to "very serious allegations of misconduct". The Portland Thorns released a statement the same day citing that some of the incidents occurred during Riley's two-year tenure as head coach of the Thorns in 2015 and discussing their reaction to the incidents at the time.

The next day, on October 1, the NWSL announced that, following discussions with the NWSLPA, all of its scheduled matches for that weekend were canceled. As well, both FIFA and U.S. Soccer announced they were starting their own investigations into Riley. The NWSL also announced that it would be launching its own investigation. That evening, league commissioner Lisa Baird announced her resignation. League general counsel Lisa Levine was also dismissed from her position. On October 4, the NWSLPA released a statement calling for the NWSL to make a number of reforms, including:
 Every coach, manager, and owner to take part in an investigation into abuse;
 The scope of the NWSL's investigation be expanded to included every club;
 The scope of the NWSL's investigation be expanded to include the league administration;
 That the league implement a "Step Back Protocol," where individuals who had been in a position of power when a person being investigated for abuse had been working under them be suspended;
 That the NWSL release the details of internal reports into abuse;
 That the NWSL co-operate with the NWSLPA;
 That the NWSLPA be given a say in the hiring of the next league commissioner.

A number of Portland Thorns players also released a statement calling for Thorns general manager Gavin Wilkinson to be suspended. Wilkinson was subsequently put on administrative leave from the Thorns, but remained manager of the MLS Portland Timbers. Later in October, players interrupted several matches to link arms in a circle in the center of a field to protest against abuse. The protest was repeated by players in several leagues outside the United States, such as the FA Women's Super League, in a gesture of solidarity.

On October 18, the NWSL announced that Marla Messing had been appointed interim-commissioner. On October 29, the NWSLPA announced that the league had met all of the union's demands for reform. On October 30, Spirit president of sporting operations Larry Best announced his resignation from the club.

On November 22, just two days after losing to the Spirit in the NWSL championship final, the Chicago Red Stars announced that head coach Rory Dames had resigned effective immediately. Later that day, The Washington Post sports reporter Molly Hensley-Clancy reported that prior to resigning, The Post had approached the Red Stars Front Office with allegations from players, both previous and current, of abuse by Dames. The Post also provided documentation of reports made to United States Soccer Federation by players such as Christen Press as far back as 2014, detailing abuse, harassment, and inappropriate use of his power as head coach to manipulate players. “Three former Red Stars players, including one who played on the team at the time of the investigation, told The Post that they had wanted to speak to U.S. Soccer investigators but had never heard from them,” reported Hensley-Clancy. “Two had left the team because of Dames’s abuse, they said.” On November 24, the Red Stars ownership released a statement apologizing to "Christen Press, Jennifer Hoy, Samantha Johnson and those players who didn’t feel safe to come forward" and saying that "our club will require significant reflection and evaluation to ensure this does not happen again."

Investigations

Yates Report 
The USSF commissioned former U.S. Deputy Attorney General Sally Yates to investigate the reported abuse and issued the results on October 3, 2022. The Yates Report included previously undisclosed information relating to the firing of Christy Holly. According to the report, he had sexually abused Racing player Erin Simon multiple times. The Yates Report also noted that multiple players who had been with Gotham FC (then Sky Blue FC) when Holly was that team's coach considered him "paranoid, ultra-aggressive, short-tempered, nasty, mean, patronizing, humiliating." Also, he was involved in a romantic relationship with then-Sky Blue captain Christie Pearce, with the Yates Report noting that according to the club's then-general manager Tony Nese, the relationship had become "so toxic and disruptive that he had 'lost the locker room'." Sky Blue had asked Holly to resign in 2017 over these issues, but the club termed his release "mutually agreed" in a press release.

The Yates Report also noted that Racing refused to fully cooperate with the investigation, saying "Racing Louisville FC refused to produce documents concerning Christy Holly and would not permit witnesses (even former employees) to answer relevant questions regarding Holly's tenure, citing non-disclosure and non-disparagement agreements it signed with Holly." The Red Stars and Thorns also did not fully cooperate with the Yates investigation.

Upon the release of the Yates Report, Portland Timbers and Thorns owner Merritt Paulson initially announced he, along with general manager Gavin Wilkinson and president Mike Golub, would step away from the Thorns. On October 5, 2022, Wilkinson and Golub were fired from the club altogether. On December 1, Paulson announced that he would sell the Thorns.

In October 2022, reacting to the Yates Report, journalist Sally Jenkins wrote a column in the Washington Post about the United States Center for SafeSport. She called SafeSport “a false front … little more than another coverup operation, a litigation-avoidance ploy and bottomless pit into which to dump complaints and disguise inaction.” In conclusion, she wrote that SafeSport is "abuser-friendly," and a sham.

NWSL/NWSLPA investigation 
The joint NWSL/NWSLPA investigation led to the release of a separate report on December 14, 2022 that provided more details on abuses within multiple NWSL teams. Notably, this report pointed out that the NWSL's culture, forged in part by the fact that its two predecessor leagues had folded, discouraged players from reporting misconduct; in fact, the NWSL had not established a firm definition of "misconduct". It also noted that the league had failed to adequately vet technical staff. For example, Holly was hired by Racing despite lacking the required coaching licenses. The release of the NWSL/NWSLPA report led to the Houston Dash not renewing Clarkson's contract, which had expired at the end of the 2022 season.

On January 9, 2023, NWSL commissioner Jessica Berman handed down discipline based on the findings of the joint league–union report. Burke, Dames, Holly, and Riley received lifetime bans from participation in the league. Former Utah Royals head coach Craig Harrington and former Gotham GM Alyse LaHue drew two-year bans, with further conditions on subsequent NWSL employment. Clarkson and Cromwell would be allowed to return to the league upon completing anti-harassment training and demonstrating a commitment to change. Benstiti, Greene, former Orlando Pride goalkeeping coach Aline Reis, and former Houston Dash coach Vera Pauw must meet the same criteria to return to the NWSL.

Reactions
The scandal sparked intense debate, including over the structure of the NWSL, a lack of transparency within the NWSL, the ownership in the NWSL, and on abuse in women's and grassroots soccer on a wider scale.

NWSL Players Association executive director Meghann Burke said that there were "systemic issues that relate to who gets these coaching jobs, who is in positions of power." Orlando Pride and Canadian national team goalkeeper Erin McLeod said that NWSL players "are being underpaid, undervalued, which makes them feel desperate and like they're replaceable. And so when they're told to lock it up, not say anything, knowing they could be replaced by someone else in the next week, they aren't given much choice." Former Republic of Ireland women's national team player Ciara McCormack said that she had "heard countless accounts of harm in sport over the last few years" and that "powerful organizations masked this abusive behavior by these top coaches and both were allowed to waltz effortlessly into new roles in similar spaces within months of being accused of sexual misconduct against players." Former Spirit player Kaiya McCullough said that "you have these people who are abusers and who are bullies and they have unilateral control over other people's livelihoods" and called for "the big players to come out and support and to call things out for things to get done because they wield more power and when you're talking about these larger power structures, these intricate systems of power, it often takes people who wield some of that power to be able to impact what's happening."

Red Stars co-owner Sarah Spain said that the scandal was "just devastating because we know the power of sport when it’s good and we also know that it can be so enabling of the worst behaviors because there’s money in it, because there’s success in it, because there’s prestige in it. And so people will default toward protecting an institution, and to see it happen in a women’s league is so infuriating," adding "how do you balance investing with sustainability?" The new interim league commissioner, Marla Messing, stated that it was necessary for the league to "make the changes that are fundamental to having a league where players feel valued and safe and feel like they are receiving the respect that they deserve."

Writing for NBC News, Britni de la Cretaz argued that homophobia within women's soccer had been under-discussed in reactions to the scandal, saying that, "while it’s true that it’s much more acceptable to be openly queer in women’s sports, there are plenty of examples that show it’s still not entirely safe," pointing to accusations of homophobia included in the claims of abuse against several of the NWSL teams. De la Cretaz further argued that "the reality is that even leagues known to be queer-friendly are often run by white, cishet men. As a result, they replicate — and enforce — existing systems of power and oppression."

Aftermath
Following the NWSL scandal, a number of abuse allegations surfaced in national teams outside the United States. A week after The Athletic investigation into the North Carolina Courage, two dozen players from the Venezuela women's national team co-signed a statement saying they'd faced "abuse and harassment, physical, psychological and sexual" from former national team head coach Kenneth Zseremeta. Two former Australia women's national soccer team players, Lisa De Vanna and Rhali Dobson, also spoke out about abuse they had faced in their national team. Football Australia and Sport Integrity Australia subsequently announced they would be launching an investigation into the claims.

The NWSL also indefinitely suspended two head coaches during the 2022 NWSL season under protective policies newly enacted in the aftermath: Houston Dash head coach and general manager James Clarkson, on April 27, 2022, by recommendation of the joint league and players association investigation into league-wide misconduct initiated in October 2021; and Orlando Pride head coach Amanda Cromwell, as well as assistant coach Sam Greene, on June 7, 2022, as subjects of a new joint league and players association investigation into allegations of retaliation.

See also
 USA Gymnastics sex abuse scandal

Footnotes

References

National Women's Soccer League
2021 scandals
Sports controversies
Sports scandals in the United States
Sexual assault in sports